Filthy Rich may refer to:

 Filthy Rich (1982 TV series), a 1982 television series starring Dixie Carter and Delta Burke
 Filthy Rich (1994 TV series), a 1994 Hong Kong television series
 Filthy Rich: Cattle Drive, a 2005 reality television series
 Filthy Rich (2016 TV series), a 2016 New Zealand television series  
 Filthy Rich (2020 TV series), a 2020 American serialized satirical drama television series
 Jeffrey Epstein: Filthy Rich, a 2020 documentary TV series
 Filthy Rich (game), a board game manufactured by Wizards of the Coast
 Filthy Rich (comics), a 2009 original graphic novel written by Brian Azzarello
 Filthy Rich, a rapper who released the 1996 album, All Frames of the Game
 Filthy Rich, a minor character from My Little Pony: Friendship Is Magic
 Filthy Rich: A Fieldguide to a Dangerous Species, a book by Peter Robbins
 Filthy Rich: A Powerful Billionaire, the Sex Scandal That Undid Him, and All the Justice That Money Can Buy: The Shocking True Story of Jeffrey Epstein, a 2017 book by James Patterson with John Connolly and Tim Malloy, about Jeffrey Epstein

See also
 Filthy Rich & Catflap, a 1980s television sitcom
 Filthy Riches, a 2017 American television series that aired on the National Geographic Channel